Brahim Zehhar (born 25 March 1935 in Casablanca, Morocco), commonly known as Tatum, is a retired Moroccan footballer.

External links
  le «Tatum» des Girondins de Bordeaux 

1935 births
Living people
Moroccan footballers
Footballers from Casablanca
Morocco international footballers
FC Girondins de Bordeaux players
Racing Club de France Football players
SC Bastia players
Olympique Alès players
Association football forwards
Expatriate footballers in France
AS Béziers Hérault (football) players